Cayman Islands competed at the 2016 Summer Olympics in Rio de Janeiro, Brazil, from 5 to 21 August 2016. This was the nation's tenth appearance at the Summer Olympics.

Cayman Islands Olympic Committee selected a total of five athletes, three men and two women, for the Games across three different sports (athletics, sailing, and swimming), matching its roster size from London 2012. Among the sports represented by the athletes, Cayman Islands marked its Olympic return in sailing after a sixteen-year absence.

The Caymanian team featured swimming siblings Geoffrey and Lara Butler, Laser Radial sailor Florence Allan, track sprinter Kemar Hyman, and hurdler Ronald Forbes, who joined Kareem Streete-Thompson as the only athletes to compete in three editions of the Games. The most experienced member of the team, Forbes was chosen by the committee to lead the delegation for the second time as Cayman Islands' flag bearer in the opening ceremony. Cayman Islands, however, has yet to win its first Olympic medal.

Athletics (track and field)
 
Caymanian athletes achieved qualifying standards in the following athletics events (up to a maximum of 3 athletes in each event):

Track & road events

Sailing
 
Cayman Islands received an invitation from the Tripartite Commission to send a sailor competing in the Laser Radial class to the Olympics, signifying the nation's comeback to the sport for the first time since 2000.

M = Medal race; EL = Eliminated – did not advance into the medal race

Swimming

Cayman Islands received a Universality invitation from FINA to send two swimmers (one male and one female) to the Olympics.

See also
Cayman Islands at the 2015 Pan American Games

References

External links 

 

Nations at the 2016 Summer Olympics
2016
2016 in Caymanian sport